Philippe Vilain (born 1969) is a French man of letters, writer, essayist, doctor of modern literature of the University of Paris III: Sorbonne Nouvelle.

Biography 
His literary work presents itself as an exploration of the consciousness of love: jealousy (L'Étreinte), the guilt of not loving enough (Le Renoncement), commitment (L'Été à Dresde), adultery (Paris l'après-midi, La Femme infidèle), paternity (Faux-père), shyness (Confession d’un timide), cultural and social difference (Pas son genre).

His theoretical work questions contemporary literature (Dans le séjour des corps. Essai sur Marguerite Duras) and Autofiction. A new defining pact is advanced in L’autofiction en théorie; Fiction homonymique ou anominale qu’un individu fait de sa vie ou d’une partie de celle-ci.

In April 2013, at the International Symposium Les intermittences du sujet : écritures de soi et discontinu (1913-2013), the University of Upper Alsace welcomed Philippe Vilain for a day of study on his work.

His novel La Femme infidèle was awarded the Prix Jean Freustié in 2013.

Villain is an associate member of the CERACC (Centre d’Etudes sur le Roman des Années Cinquante au Contemporain) at the university Sorbonne-Nouvelle Paris III.

Works

Novels 
1997: L'Étreinte, Éditions Gallimard,  
1999: La Dernière Année, Gallimard, 
2001: Le Renoncement, novel, Gallimard,   
2003: L'Été à Dresde, novel, Gallimard,  
2006: Paris l'après-midi, Éditions Grasset, Prix François Mauriac of the Académie française 2007
2008: Faux-père, Grasset,  
2011: Pas son genre, Grasset, (reissued in 2014 at the time of the cinematographic adaptation of Lucas Belvaux Pas son genre), Prix Scrivere per amore 2012 in Italy
2013: La Femme infidèle, Grasset, Prix Jean Freustié 2013
2015: Une idée de l'enfer, Grasset

Essays 
2005: Défense de Narcisse, followed by an interview with Serge Doubrovsky, Grasset
2005: Retours à Hugo, photographs by Jean-Luc Chapin, Confluences
2009: L'Autofiction en théorie, followed by two interviews with Philippe Sollers and Philippe Lejeune, La Transparence
2009: Confession d'un timide, Grasset
2010: Dans le séjour des corps. Essay on Marguerite Duras, La Transparence, series "Essais d'esthétique"
2011: Dit-il.
2011: Éloge de l'arrogance, Éditions du Rocher
2016: La littérature sans idéal, Grasset, 
2020: La Passion d'Orphée, Grasset.

Preface 
 Le donjuanisme est un humanisme, preface Don Juan [1665] by Molière, Hatier, 2009.

Interviews 
 Je interdit ?, information gathered by Anne Crignon, Le Nouvel Observateur, n° 2101, 10–16 February 2005.
 Philippe Vilain l’immoraliste, information gathered by Emmanuelle Desforges, Littéréalité (University of Toronto), vol. XVIII, n° 2, Autumn/Winter 2006, p. 27-33.
 Entre Egoismo e generosidade, interview with Miguel Conde, O Globo, Prosa § Verso (Brazil), 17 November 2007.
 L’amour, comme pour Stendhal, est ma grande affaire, interview with Vincent Roy. Transfuge, April 2011.
  L’amore ? E una questione di soldi, interview with Gianni Rossi Barilli, Grazia (Italy), n° 10, 5 March 2012.
 Tout le monde est écrivain sauf moi (2003), in Philippe Sollers. Fugues, Gallimard, 2012.

Television 
 Bouillon de culture, hosted by Bernard Pivot, France 2, 15 October 1999
 Ce soir ou jamais, hoted by Frédéric Taddeï, France 3, 23 November 2006

Distinctions 
 Prix François Mauriac of the Académie française 2007 for Paris l'après-midi
 Prix Scrivere per amore 2012 in Italy for Pas son genre
 Prix Jean Freustié 2013 for La Femme infidèle

Adaptations of his works

Theatre 
 La Dernière Année, adapted to theatre -Proscenium- by Jean-Paul Muel in 2002.

Cinema 
 Not My Type, based on his eponymous novel, French film directed by Lucas Belvaux, 2014.

Bibliography

Articles 
 Johan Faerber (Université Paris III), Une vie sans histoire. Ou l’impact autobiographique dans l’œuvre de Philippe Vilain, Revue de Littérature Comparée (Autobiographies), January–March 2008, p. 131-140. 
 Philippe Gasparini, Autofiction. Une aventure du langage.- Paris: Éditions du Seuil, series "Poétique", 2008, p. 262-266.
 Sabine Van Wesemael (Université d’Amsterdam), Philippe Vilain se penche sur le miroir de son enfance, Actes du Colloque Relations familiales dans les littératures française et francophones des XXe et XXIe siècles : la figure de la mère, Université de Pau, 26 October 2006, Paris, L’Harmattan, 2008, p. 47-56.

Printed press 
 Christine Rousseau, 'J’ai le sentiment d’être écrit par l’écriture', in Le Monde des Livres, 3 October 2008.
 Sophie Pujas, Philippe Vilain : Vaine pudeur, Transfuge, June 2010.
 Emmanuel Gehrig, L’audace du timide, Le Temps (Switzerland), August 2010.

References

External links 
 Philippe Villain on Babelio
 "Pas son genre", de Philippe Vilain : les amours illusoires d'un philosophe et d'une coiffeuse on Le Monde (23 June 2011)
 Philippe Villain on France Inter
 La littérature sans idéal de Philippe Vilain on Stalker (18 August 2016)
 Confession du timide Philippe Vilain on L'Express (15 June 2010)
 Conversation avec Philippe Vilain on D-Fiction (21 November 1816)
 Philippe Vilain : La littérature a troqué son idéal littéraire contre un idéal marchand on Diacritik (10 May 2016)

20th-century French non-fiction writers
21st-century French non-fiction writers
21st-century French essayists
Prix Jean Freustié winners
1969 births
Living people